Fjuken is a weekly local newspaper published in Skjåk, Norway. It serves for Skjåk, Lom and Vågå.

History and profile
Fjuken was founded in 1989. The founders were initially community members. The paper is published by the company Skjåk Mediautvikling AS, which in turn has the following owners:
Lom og Skjåk Sparebank 21.5%
Fjordingen AS 21.3%
Polaris Media 18.7%
other 38.5%

The paper had the 2006 circulation of 4,109 copies, of which 3,895 were subscribers.

References

Norwegian Media Registry

External links
Fjuken homepage

1989 establishments in Norway
Weekly newspapers published in Norway
Norwegian-language newspapers
Mass media in Oppland
Newspapers established in 1989